Inside Housing is a monthly trade publication that covers the United Kingdom's social housing sector. The magazine was first published on 30 March 1984, and is part of Ocean Media Group. The headquarters is in London. In 2007, the majority stake of Ocean Media was acquired by AAC Capital Partners.

Inside Housing presents development awards each year for:
Best older people's housing development (under 70 homes and 71 or over)
Best shared ownership development
Design quality
Best build-for-rent development
Best approach to modular construction
Best partnership (under 100 units and 101 or over)
Market sale development of the year
Best development team (under 20 members and 21 or over)
Best regeneration project (under 70 homes and 71 or over)
Best inclusive development
Best affordable housing development (under 25 homes and 26-70 and 71 or over)
Best residential development (under 70 homes and 71 or over)

References

External links
Inside Housing
WorldCat

1984 establishments in the United Kingdom
Business magazines published in the United Kingdom
Housing in the United Kingdom
Magazines established in 1984
Magazines published in London
Professional and trade magazines
Weekly magazines published in the United Kingdom